Kessler or Keßler is a surname of German and Jewish (Ashkenazi) origins. It is an occupational name that means coppersmith, or more precisely, a kettle (German ) maker. In alpine countries the name derived from the definition: the one living in the basin of a valley.

People named Kessler include:
 Achim Kessler (born 1964), German politician
 Amalia Kessler, American lawyer
 Anna Rose Kessler Moore, American singer
 Andy Kessler (author), (born 1959), author, investor, financier
 Andy Kessler (skateboarder), (died 2009), skateboarder
 Barbara Kessler, American singer-songwriter
 Bruce Kessler, television and film director
 Chad Kessler (American football) (born 1975), American football player
 Cody Kessler, American football player
 Daniel Kessler (guitarist), lead guitarist for post-punk band Interpol
 David Aaron Kessler, scientist and former commissioner of the Food and Drug Administration
 David Kessler (actor), (1860–1920), Yiddish actor
 Donald J. Kessler, NASA scientist
 Edwin Kessler (1928–2017), an American atmospheric scientist who oversaw the development of Doppler weather radar in the US and was the first director of the National Severe Storms Laboratory (NSSL)
 Alice & Ellen Kessler, twins known for their participation in the Eurovision Song Contest 1959
 Frederick P. Kessler, Wisconsin legislator
 Friedrich Kessler, (1901–1998), American academic and scholar
 Geldolph Adriaan Kessler, Dutch industrialist and footballer
 George Kessler, city planner and landscape architect
 Germán Kessler (born 1994), Uruguayan rugby union player
 Gladys Kessler, American jurist
 Glenn Kessler (journalist), American journalist and author
 Glenn Kessler (screenwriter), American screenwriter and television producer
 Gustav Kessler, German trade unionist
 Harry Graf Kessler (1868–1937), an Anglo-German count, diplomat, writer, and patron of modern art
 Heinz Kessler (1920–2017), general from East Germany
 Henry Kessler (baseball) (1847–1900), American baseball player
 Jason Kessler (born 1983), organizer of the deadly white nationalist Unite the Right rally in Charlottesville, Virginia
 Jean Baptiste August Kessler, Dutch oil explorer
 Jimmy Kessler, the first native Texan to assume leadership of Congregation B'nai Israel, Galveston, Texas
 John Kessler, Wisconsin legislator
 John Kessler (naval historian) (1761–1840)
 John Kessler, birth name of Jack Baker (magician) (1913/1914–1980), American magician
 Josef Alois Kessler, Volga German bishop
 Joseph Christoph Kessler, German pianist and composer
 Julius Kessler, was the founder of Kessler Whiskey
 Karl Fedorovich Kessler (1815–1881), German-Russian zoologist; author of zoological taxa signed Kessler
 Karl G. Kessler (1919–1997), American physicist
 Kent Kessler (born 1957), American musician
 Linse Kessler (born 1966), Danish television personality, actress and businesswoman
 Liz Kessler, British author of children's books
 Matthias Kessler, German professional road racing cyclist
 Meredith Kessler (born 1978), American athlete
 Meir Kessler, rabbi
 Michael Kessler, German actor and comedian
 Michael G. Kessler, cited as first "forensic auditor", founder of Kessler International
 Mikkel Kessler, Danish boxer
 Minuetta Kessler (1914–2002), Canadian/American concert pianist, classical music composer, and educator
 Nadine Keßler, retired German footballer
 Oren Kessler, American political analyst, author and journalist
 Robert Kessler, All American basketball player (Purdue) and GM executive
 Ronald Kessler, American journalist and author
 Ronald C. Kessler (born 1947) American sociologist and psychiatrical epidemiologist
 Ryan Kesler, American NHL player
 Todd Ellis Kessler, American television writer and producer
 Walker Kessler (born 2001), American basketball player

Fictional people 
 Kessler, main antagonist in the video game, inFamous
 At the time of the shooting of the original Seinfeld pilot titled "The Seinfeld Chronicles", Kenny Kramer had not yet given consent to use his name, and so Cosmo Kramer's character was originally referred to as "Kessler"
 David Kessler is the name of the main character in the 1981 comedy-horror film An American Werewolf in London
 Edward Anselm 'Eddie' Kessler is the name of a character in HBO's Boardwalk Empire.
 Monty Kessler is the name of Brendan Fraser's character in the film With Honours
 Ulrich Kesler (voiced by Shūichi Ikeda) is a character in the science-fiction series Legend of the Galactic Heroes.
 Marie Kessler, aunt of protagonist Nick Burkhart in Grimm
 Kelly Kessler Burkhart, mother of protagonist Nick BurkHart in Grimm
 Donald Kessler, a character in the 1996 science fiction comedy film Mars Attacks!
 Baroness Kessler, a character played by Barbara Jefford in the 1999 mystery thriller film The Ninth Gate
 Mitch Kessler, the main character, played by Steve Carell, of the Apple TV+ television show The Morning Show
 Gestapo Sturmbannführer Ludwig Kessler (played by Clifford Rose), a character in the tv series Secret Army and Kessler

See also 
 Kessler R. Cannon (1915–1986), American politician
 Joe Spleen, born Andy Kessler, guitarist for The Gits
 Kessler (disambiguation)

References 

Jewish surnames
Occupational surnames
Yiddish-language surnames
Dutch-language surnames
German-language surnames